The Calleguas Creek Site is a  archeological site on Calleguas Creek and the Oxnard Plain, near Oxnard in Ventura County, Southern California.

Description
It is the site of a former village of the Chumash people, and includes their burial sites.

The archeological site has been designated as CA-Ven-110, and was listed with its location is not disclosed on the National Register of Historic Places (NRHP) in 1976.  It received NRHP listing to protect its potential to yield archeological information in the future.

Calleguas Creek context
The Calleguas Creek watershed area was of importance to the Chumash. They had at least five villages along the creek, which "provided them with sources of food, ceremony, cultural materials for baskets, jewelry, and clothing."  Sites of Chumash burials have been uncovered at the Calleguas Creek Site and the others.

Unfortunately there has been "unlawful dredging and filling activity in the creek bed and channelization activities, [which] alter[s] and destroy[s] sacred sites and burial sites, sometimes without the knowledge of Chumash and scientific communities."

Calleguas Creek is one of California's most heavily polluted rivers, from agricultural runoff, urban and suburban runoff, and sewage discharges. It empties into the Pacific Ocean at Mugu Lagoon in the former Naval Air Station Point Mugu, present day Naval Base Ventura County.  The saltwater wetlands and estuary habitat of the lagoon area is nonetheless significant.

See also

National Register of Historic Places listings in Ventura County, California

References 

Chumash populated places
Oxnard, California
Archaeological sites on the National Register of Historic Places in California
Burials in Ventura County, California
National Register of Historic Places in Ventura County, California
Populated places on the National Register of Historic Places in California